Meeker may refer to:

Places
 Camp Meeker, California
 Meeker, Colorado
 Meeker, Louisiana
 Meeker, Ohio
 Meeker, Oklahoma
 Meeker, West Virginia
 Meeker, Wisconsin
 Meeker and Marcy Avenues Line, Brooklyn New York
 Meeker County, Minnesota
 Meeker Island Lock and Dam, Minnesota
 Meeker Peak, Nevada
 Meeker Slough, California
 Meeker Southern Railroad, Washington
 Meeker Sugar Refinery, Louisiana
 Meeker's Hardware, Connecticut
 Meekers Grove, Wisconsin
 Mount Meeker, Colorado

People with the surname
 Arthur Meeker, Jr. (1902-1971), American novelist
 Bradley B. Meeker (1813-1873), American jurist
 Charles Meeker, American politician  
 Edward Meeker (1874-1937), American singer and performer
 Ezra Meeker (1830-1928), American pioneer who promoted the preservation of the Oregon Trail
 George Meeker (1904-1984), American actor 
 Howie Meeker (born 1923), Canadian hockey player and politician
 Jacob Edwin Meeker (1878-1918), American politician
 Joseph Rusling Meeker (1827-1887), American painter
 Josephine Meeker (1857-1882), American teacher and physician 
 Jotham Meeker (1804-1855), Baptist missionary to the Indians in Kansas
 Judith Meeker, American founder of More Than Warmth
 Leonard C. Meeker (1916–2014), American politician, lawyer and diplomat
 Marilyn Meeker, American ice dancer
 Mary G. Meeker (born 1959), American investment banker and securities analyst
 Mary N. Meeker (1921–2003), American educational psychologist
 Mike Meeker (born 1958), Canadian ice hockey player 
 Nathan Meeker (1817-1879), 19th-century homesteading entrepreneur in Colorado, USA, victim of Meeker Massacre
 Ralph Meeker (1920-1988), American actor
 Roy Meeker (1900-1929), American baseball player
 Royal Meeker (1873-1953), American economist
 Samuel Meeker (1763–1831), descendant of William Meeker, prominent early citizen of Philadelphia
 Theresa Meeker (born 1986), Italian-American actress 
 Tony Meeker (born 1939), American politician in Oregon
 William Meeker, founder of Elizabeth, New Jersey in 1660

Other uses
 Dink Meeker, character in Orson Scott Card's Ender's Game series
 Meeker, character in the 2002 Nickelodeon film Clockstoppers
 Howie Meeker's Hockey School, Canadian television program
 , US Navy tank landing ship